The Surduc is a left tributary of the river Apa Mare in Romania. It discharges into the Apa Mare in Becicherecu Mic.

References

Rivers of Romania
Rivers of Timiș County